State Highway 75 (SH 75) is a Colorado state highway in Jefferson and Arapahoe counties. The southern terminus is at SH 470 in Columbine and the northern terminus is at Bowles Avenue in Littleton.

Route description

History
Formerly, SH 75 continued into Littleton past the Lowell Blvd. intersection by turning east onto Bowles Ave. toward the junction with US 85. Past this junction, SH 75 would traverse a one-way couplet consisting of Alamo Avenue (eastbound) and Main Street (westbound), before the one-way streets merged into Littleton Boulevard. At the Broadway intersection, SH 75 would turn north onto Broadway, where it would enter Englewood and eventually intersect SH 88 (Belleview Avenue). Finally, SH 75 would meet its historic end at US 285 in Englewood.

Major intersections

References

External links

075
Transportation in Jefferson County, Colorado
Transportation in Arapahoe County, Colorado
Littleton, Colorado